The Xuzhou Metro is a rapid transit system in Xuzhou, Jiangsu Province, China. Construction began in February 2014, and Line 1 was opened on September 28, 2019, Line 2 was opened on November 28, 2020, and  Line 3 was opened on June 28, 2021.

The total investment is expected to be 44.3 billion renminbi.

In its first year of operation the ridership was 7.5 million (2019).

Lines in operation

Line 1

Line 1 began construction in February 2014. It runs from Luwo in the west to Xuzhoudong Railway Station in the east. In June 2018, the civil engineering construction work was reported to be 95% complete, leaving mostly track laying, decorations, and electromechanical installations to be completed. On August 30, 2018, railway work was declared complete, and electromechanical installations and decorations declared as "under intense progress". It was opened on September 28, 2019. Line 1 runs in east–west, starting from Luwo Station in Tongshan District in the west, and ending at Xuzhoudong Railway Station in Jiawang District in the east. It passes through Quanshan District, Gulou District, and Yunlong District, covering the east–west passenger flow corridor of Xuzhou City. Important nodes in Xuzhou city downtown, Bashan Area, and Chengdong New District connect to commercial centers such as People's Square, Pengcheng Square, Huaihai Square and Wanda Plaza, and quickly connect with the two major comprehensive passenger transport hubs, Xuzhou Railway Station and Xuzhoudong Railway Station.

Line 1 opened on September 28, 2019. This was the first metro line in Xuzhou city. There are a total of 18 stations, including one elevated station and 17 underground stations. Rolling stock for line 1 is six-section B-type trains. As of November 2020, the average daily ridership of Line 1 is 56,500, and the single-day ridership record is 150,000, set on October 2, 2019. Yearly ridership for 2020 on line 1 was 19 million.

Line 2

The line is fully underground Xuzhou Metro Line 2 was the second metro line in Xuzhou city to open. It is a north–south to east–west backbone line that runs through the old city and Xuzhou New District, covering the north and southeast passenger flow corridors of the city, connecting the Jiulishan area, the old city and the new city.

Line 3

It runs between Xiadian and Gaoxinqunan, connecting the North Zone, Central Zone, and South Zone of Xuzhou city.

Line 3 is colored “Technological Blue”, selected in a poll.

Lines under construction

Line 3 (Phase 2)
The phase 2 of Line 3 will extend to Houpantaocun to north and to Mailou to south. It will add  in total by 2025.

Line 6
It will run between Huangshanlu Station and Xuzhoudong Railway Station. It is planned to open in September 2025. Line 6 will use fully automated trains operating in GoA4 mode.

Future development

Second phase
Construction is planned begin on the second phase of the Xuzhou Metro, including Line 4, Line 5, Line 6, and the second phase of Line 3. Construction is expected to be completed in 2024. The second phase will add  to the system.

It will run between Tuolanshan and Qiaoshangcun.

It will run between Olympic Sports Center South and Xukuangcheng.

It will run between Huangshanlu and Xuzhou East Railway Station.

These lines was approved by the National Development and Reform Commission on January 20, 2020.

Third phase 
The third phase of metro lines, still in planning, will complete the Xuzhou Metro's complete plan of 7 urban metro lines and 4 suburban lines. This phase will include the second phases of Line 1 and Line 2 and the entirety of Line 7, as well as the suburban lines S1, S2, S3, and S4.

Network map

References

 
Rapid transit in China
Rail transport in Jiangsu
Transport infrastructure under construction in China
2019 establishments in China
Railway lines opened in 2019
Automated guideway transit